Juvenilia is an EP by American singer-songwriter Liz Phair, released in 1995. The EP is essentially a single for the song "Jealousy" from the album Whip-Smart, though this release includes a few songs recorded by Phair under her Girly-Sound moniker in 1991, namely "California," "South Dakota," "Batmobile," "Dead Shark," and "Easy."

The EP contains a cover of the song "Turning Japanese" by The Vapors and a previously unreleased original song, "Animal Girl."

Track listing
All songs written by Liz Phair unless otherwise noted.
"Jealousy" – 3:37
"Turning Japanese" (David Fenton) – 3:38
"Animal Girl" – 3:57
"California" – 2:43
"South Dakota" – 4:18
"Batmobile" – 3:06
"Dead Shark" – 3:11
"Easy" – 3:11

Credits
Liz Phair – vocals, guitar, piano
Brad Wood – mixing
Casey Rice – mixing
Jim Ellison – performer
Material Issue –  performer

References

Liz Phair albums
1995 EPs
Matador Records EPs